Miss International 2019, the 59th Miss International pageant, was held on November 12, 2019, at Tokyo Dome City Hall in Bunkyo district, Tokyo, Japan. Mariem Velazco of Venezuela crowned her successor Sireethorn Leearamwat of Thailand at the end of the event.

Contestants from 83 countries and territories participated in this year's Miss International pageant, surpassing the previous record of 77 contestants in 2018, making this edition the biggest turnout in the pageant's history.

The pageant was hosted by Tetsuya Bessho in his sixth consecutive year as host.

Background
 
On April 11, 2019, the Miss International organization announced that the 2019 pageant would be held on November 12, 2019, in Tokyo Dome City Hall, Bunkyo, Tokyo, Japan, the competition's venue for the fourth consecutive year.

Results

Placements

Continental queens

Special awards

Pageant 
Following the same format as in the 2018 competition, contestants were classified under five continents: (1) Europe, (2) Oceania, (3) Africa, (4) Americas, and (5) Asia. Competition rounds consisted of national costume, swimwear, and evening gown. The contestants were trimmed to 15 semifinalists. After which, they were narrowed down to the top 8 finalists. The top 8 were then each given a chance to deliver their prepared final speech. The top 5 were then selected: Miss International 2019 and her four runners-up is the same format as in the 2017.

Contestants 
83 contestants competed for the title.

Notes

Debuts

Returns

Last competed in 1969:
 
Last competed in 2008:
 
Last competed in 2009:
 
Last competed in 2012:
 
 
Last competed in 2013:
 
 
Last competed in 2014:
 
Last competed in 2015:
 
Last competed in 2016:
 
 
Last competed in 2017:

Designations

Replacements

Withdrawals
  – No Contest, will not send their representative to the competition this year.
 
  – No Contest, due to lack of sponsorship.
  – No Contest, due to lack of sponsorship.
  – No Contest, due to lack of sponsorship.
  – No Contest.
  – No Contest, due to lack of sponsorship.
  – Because of the 2019 Japan–South Korea trade dispute, the Miss Korea Organization decided not to send their representative to the competition this year.
 
  
  – No Contest, due to lack of sponsorship.

Crossovers 
Contestants who previously competed or will be competing at other international beauty pageants:

Miss Universe
 2018: : Athena McNinch
 2018: : Andrea Toscano
 2020: : Angèle Kossinda
Miss Earth
 2016: : Stephanie Sical
 2017: : Angèle Kossinda (Top 16)
 2018: : Sona Danielyan
 2018: : Monique Shippen
 2020: : Annabella Pamela Fleck (Top 20)
Miss Supranational
 2015: : Rachel Nimegeers (Top 20)
 2018: : Sonia Ait Mansour (as )
 2018: : Andreea Coman (Top 10)
 2019: : Angèle Kossinda (Top 25)
Miss Grand International
 2017: : Rachel Nimegeers
 2017: : Sonia Ait Mansour (as )
 2018: : Pawani Vithanage (Top 20)
Miss Asia Pacific International
 2018: : Sona Danielyan
Miss Intercontinental
 2017: : Eunice Elizabeth Raquel Basco (as )
Top Model of the World
 2016: : Sonia Ait Mansour (as )
Miss Eco International
 2017: : Sonia Ait Mansour (as )
Miss Tourism International
 2018: : Nikita Ah Horan
Miss Tourism World (China-based)
 2018: : Mari Oreshkina (Winner)
Miss Tourism Queen International
 2018: : Rachel Nimegeers (2nd Runner-up)
Miss Tourism and Culture Universe
Miss Europe
 2017: : Sonia Ait Mansour (as )
Miss Europe World
 2019: : Annabella Pamela Fleck (Top 10)
Reina Hispanoamericana
 2018: : Selena Maria Urias
 2018: : Ana Rita Aguiar
Reina Del Tropico
 2018: : Selena Maria Urias
Queen Beauty Universe
 2017: : Alica Ondrášová
Face of Beauty International
 2014: : Athena McNinch
 2015: : Sonia Ait Mansour (as ''; Top 15)
World Miss University 
 2018: : Ana Rita Aguiar

References

External links

2019
2019 in Tokyo
2019 beauty pageants
Beauty pageants in Japan
November 2019 events in Japan